Sagra is a village in Basti, Uttar Pradesh, India. It is one of the famous village of Basti district. Sagra is at the border of Basti and  Siddharthnagar districts. Most of the population belongs to the Hindu community. Agriculture is the main source of employment. There  are around 12 water bodies. A big pond, also called Sagra, is situated in the middle of the village.

References

Villages in Siddharthnagar district